Hamzalar is a village in the Kâhta District of Adıyaman Province in Turkey. The village is populated by Kurds of the Kawan tribe and had a population of 222 in 2021.

The hamlet of Ödemiş is attached to the village.

References 

Kurdish settlements in Adıyaman Province
Villages in Kâhta District